Mary Fackler Schiavo is the former Inspector General of the United States Department of Transportation (DOT), where for six years she withstood pressure from within DOT and the Federal Aviation Administration (FAA) as she sought to expose and correct problems she perceived at the agencies.  In 1997, after her stormy tenure at the DOT, Schiavo wrote Flying Blind, Flying Safe, which summed up her numerous concerns about the FAA's systemic flaws.

In 1987 and 1988, Schiavo, then known as Mary Sterling, handled Foreign Intelligence Surveillance Act (FISA) requests as a special assistant to then US Attorney General Edwin Meese.  From 1989 to 1990, she also served at the United States Department of Labor as Assistant Secretary of Labor for Labor Management Standards. She also criticized the work of the 9/11 Commission.

Schiavo is interested in air safety, has represented many air-crash survivors, and appeared on investigative programs such as Frontline.

She graduated from Harvard University and New York University.

USDOT career
In 1990 President of the United States George H. W. Bush appointed Schiavo as the Inspector General of the U.S. Department of Transportation. Schiavo began campaigns to curb the sale of unapproved aircraft parts. The investigations under Schiavo, by 1996, lead to over 150 criminal convictions and over $47 million USD in restitutions and fines. The resulting prison sentences from the convictions ranged up to five years per person.

Flying Blind

In 1997, after leaving her post at the DOT and long before the September 11, 2001 terrorist attacks, Schiavo wrote Flying Blind, Flying Safe, a scathing expose of the fraud, corruption, waste, mismanagement, and dangerous negligence in the aviation industry and the FAA, as a crusader for flight safety.   Her primary criticisms in the book focus on the FAA's reluctance to address its many shortcomings, while expressing her concern that there was a fundamental conflict of interest between the FAA job of oversight and the FAA job of promoting aviation.

In Flying Blind, Schiavo describes how the FAA uses a formula ascribing specific monetary value to human lives, and how the agency allows numbers to decide whether the cost of extra safety is worth the additional expense (e.g., if equipping an airline fleet with smoke detectors would cost $100 million, but would only save 10 lives each worth $1 million, then the expense is ruled out).  Schiavo is similarly critical of the internal FAA politics and the FAA's Administrators.  She writes, "I can't remember when I started calling these men the 'Kidney Stone Administrators', but I do know that it became apparent to me early on that they were tolerated only because everyone at the FAA knew it was merely time before they would pass."

One reviewer was critical of the book, because he felt that "[h]er fundamental mistake is to argue that the FAA should pursue safety literally at all cost." Schiavo criticized the FAA for assigning monetary values to human lives; however laws requiring cost-benefit analyses (like the Regulatory Flexibility Act) require the FAA to assign monetary values to all potential losses and to analyze the cost to the public, if a proposed rule is implemented, and the cost if the rule is not implemented. The book has also been faulted many times for factual errors both scientific and legal.

ValuJet Flight 592 crash

After the Secretary of Transportation insisted that ValuJet was safe, Schiavo produced contrary evidence from government files.  In the book's analysis of the ValuJet Flight 592 Crash, Schiavo reviews evidence the FAA had to have known ValuJet was quite unsafe.  The FAA wanted ValuJet to survive, according to Schiavo, and as a result the FAA did not do its job of overseeing and enforcing rules.  The FAA later shut the airline down.  In 1997, unable to shake off the stigma of the crash, ValuJet merged with the smaller AirTran and started operations under that name. It has subsequently merged with Southwest Airlines.

The Ohio State University

In 1997, she was selected to receive the Outstanding Alumnus Award.  During the 1997–98 academic year, Schiavo was a visiting professor, teaching a required graduate administrative law class, in the University's Master of Public Policy program, now the John Glenn School of Public Affairs.  She was well respected by students, and received positive evaluations.  At the end of the course, she provided students with a letter, offering guidance in their government careers.  An especially meaningful passage reminded students that when people sought help, they generally phoned 911; however, as public servants, they were 911, meaning they had no one to phone.  She reminded students of the goals and values of government, and warned that they may need to stand alone.  After completing the professor in residence appointment in Public Policy, she accepted the McConnell Aviation Chair, teaching from 1998 to 2002.

Columbus bomb scare
In 1999, Schiavo was responsible for a bomb scare that partially shut down the Port Columbus International Airport in Columbus, Ohio for four hours. A bag was checked in her name for a flight, but she did not board the plane. When inspected in an X-ray machine, the luggage contained what appeared to be a bomb, but upon further inspection, the bag contained a disassembled bomb with no explosives inside. Schiavo was at the airport at the time of the discovery with a film crew from a local TV station. No criminal charges were filed against her for the incident.

9/11 criticism
Schiavo also contends FAA officials refused to believe the US faced a threat of domestic terrorism prior to 9/11, alleging flight schools "fairly well salivated at the thought of getting lots of foreign students, and the FAA encouraged it."

She has represented many of the families who have sued the U.S. airlines involved in the 9/11 terrorist attacks.

Schiavo criticized the way 9/11 commission disclosed information given to it during the several hearings. The New York Observer reported: Ms. Schiavo sat in on the commission's hearing on aviation security on 9/11 and was disgusted by what it left out. "In any other situation, it would be unthinkable to withhold investigative material from an independent commission," she told this writer. "There are usually grave consequences. But the commission is clearly not talking to everybody or not telling us everything."

References

External links

  – 'Mary Schiavos Books, Articles and Other Resources for Aviation Safety and Security'
 
 AvWeb.com – 'Flying Blind, Flying Safe by Mary Schiavo' (book review), Carl Marbach (June 23, 1997)
 Oprah.com – ' An Expert Weighs in' (from the show "When Will You Fly Again?"), The Oprah Winfrey Show (November 16, 2001)
 Smoke Hoods?
 Suspicious Bag Shuts Down Airport (April 13, 1999)
 PlaneSafe.org – 'Mary Schiavo Speech'
 StarTribune.com – 'FAA security took no action against Moussaoui', Greg Gordon, Star Tribune (Jan 13, 2002)
 Demise of the Airline Pilot – Personal POV column regarding  political "aviation muckracking" and the  "fake bomb incident". "Culture Wars" April 2011.
 Reason Foundation
 http://www.cnn.com/profiles/mary-schiavo-profile
 https://www.bloomberg.com/research/stocks/people/person.asp?personId=641080&privcapId=314750
 http://glenn.osu.edu/alumni/newsletter/past-editions/2013/alumninews8-13.html
 The Ohio State University School of Public Affairs, course records

Schiavio, Mary
American whistleblowers
Lawyers who have represented the United States government
Living people
Harvard University alumni
Ohio State University alumni
New York University School of Law alumni
United States Department of Justice lawyers
United States Department of Transportation officials
White House Fellows
Year of birth missing (living people)
Aviation lawyers